Diaphania infernalis is a moth in the family Crambidae. It was described by Heinrich Benno Möschler in 1890. It is found in Puerto Rico.

References

Moths described in 1890
Diaphania